Sonia Hilda Cox (25 December 1936 – 23 August 2001), was a badminton and tennis player from New Zealand.

Cox began playing badminton when she was 11 years old. She attended Otago Girls' High School, where she continued to play badminton. When she was 14 years old, she started to play in the Otago provincial team and she was placed eighth in the national rankings. In 1953, when she was 16 years old, she was part of the New Zealand badminton team which travelled to Tasmania, Australia, for a tour of competitions.

Cox held the national title in women's badminton six times: 1953 to 1957 and again in 1960. In 1960 she was part of a New Zealand women's team which competed in the Uber Cup in the United States and progressed to the finals of the tournament.

Cox played tennis competitively as well, including in the national tournaments in 1955 and 1956, and at The Championships, Wimbledon in 1958. At Wimbledon she competed in the ladies' singles, in the ladies' doubles with Ruia Morrison and in the mixed doubles with Peter Nicholls.

References

New Zealand female badminton players
New Zealand female tennis players
People educated at Otago Girls' High School
1936 births
2001 deaths